Esco "Sark" Sarkkinen (April 9, 1918 – February 28, 1998) was an American football player and coach.  He played college football at Ohio State University from 1937 to 1939 and was a consensus first-team end on the 1939 College Football All-America Team.   He also served as an assistant coach for the Ohio State Buckeyes football team from 1946 to 1978.

Early life
Sarkkinen's parents, Eino Sr. and Rauha "Rose" Sarkkinen, were Finnish emigrants; his father was from Oulu and had emigrated to New York City in 1914, and his mother had emigrated to the United States in 1904.

References

1918 births
1998 deaths
American football ends
Manhattan Beach Coast Guard Depth Bombers football players
Ohio State Buckeyes football coaches
Ohio State Buckeyes football players
All-American college football players
People from Conneaut, Ohio
People from Lake County, Ohio
Players of American football from Ohio
American people of Finnish descent